The Soviet Union used its relationship with Western Europe to gain favourable economic cooperation with the Arab world during the Cold War, and gained influence in the Middle East by inciting proxy conflicts between the Arab states and their Jewish neighbour. However, both superpowers interacted with proxy combatants, which factored into the Soviet Union's omission from the Camp David Accords of 1978. The policy exposed Soviet dualism; while aiming to reduce their military budget and improve their image of the world stage, they pursued an anti-Israel, pro-Arab policy in the Middle East.

Background 

The Middle East went from an afterthought of the UN Security Council to its main focus although the Arab nations lacked a lobby and had only the regional Arab League to mediate disputes. The Soviets could enter the region by appealing to the working class, which was most of the region's population.

Petroleum, nationalism, and religion 
The interconnection of religion, nationalism, and petroleum played a part in the growing divide between the Arabs and the Soviets. As Arab nationalism gained in popularity, Islam moved to the forefront as a unifier against Israel and the West. All three were the basis for the creation of OPEC and the modern Arab world, which led to a growing Arab distrust of outside influence. Religion was a binding factor of the Arabs and their states, as Christianity joins the West in times of social and political unrest. When the Soviet Union invaded Afghanistan, the Arabs were uncertain of Soviet intentions since the Soviets invaded to bolster the Afghan Communist Party (whose attempted coup was failing). Oil affects world politics; the creation of OPEC led to Arab stability, moving them beyond the communist or capitalist spheres. This fence-sitting allowed the Arabs to gain economic power over the West and the Soviets, while losing nothing.

Soviet foreign policy 
The relationship between the Soviet Union and the Middle East focused on rivalry with the Turks, mistrust of the Persians, and the Afghan conflict. Under Nikita Khrushchev, the Soviets were inconsistent in their Middle Eastern policies and mistrusted by the Arabs. The Arabs viewed the Soviets as anti-imperialistic (since the Russian Revolution overthrew the Russian monarchy) and, after Arab setbacks following the Arab-Israeli wars, as bureaucrats concerned solely with Soviet interests. Soviet inconsistency and their weapon inferiority to the West were the main reasons for the Arabs distancing themselves from Moscow and returning to the West. The Soviets tried to slow (if not halt) the flow of Arab petroleum to the West. After the Six-Day War, the Soviet Union became a major player in the Middle East as its proxy countries dragged it deeper into Mideast political intrigue. The Soviets provided continued support to their Arab allies in their struggle with Israel. Moscow's policy changed after the Yom Kippur War as it used its client states to act out aggression toward the West during the Iran–Iraq War. The Soviets were a strongman in the Middle East and interceded to maintain tensions as a distraction to the West. Soviet foreign policy in the Middle East emphasized the Arab nations and their interaction with the West. Moscow had little use for the region except to distract Washington from Berlin early in the Cold War. John S. Badeau wrote about the background of Soviet-American relations with the Arabs after World War II in Proceedings of the Academy of Political Science.

Soviet–Arab relations 
The Soviet policy of favoring one Arab group often drove the others towards the West. Increased Soviet favoritism towards Iraq and Syria pushed Egypt (former Soviet ally) and Saudi Arabia back towards the West. The Soviets used a stick-and-carrot approach to persuade the Arabs into joining their sphere of influence, although the Arab League maintained closer ties with religion. The Soviets' invasion of Afghanistan severely reduced their popularity and credibility in the Arab world. Although Moscow initially reaped rewards from its involvement in the Arab world, it lost diplomatic trust through its missteps and lackluster policies. In addition to their invasion of Afghanistan, their most notable mistake was to initially support both Iran and Iraq during their early-1980s war before only supporting Iraq. This cost Iran the diplomatic respect of the Arab nations, pushing it further towards the West.

Tensions in the Middle East 

The Arab world dealt with social tensions through conflict, which the Soviets used to drive wedges between the Arabs and the West. The Middle East (the birthplace of Islam, Judaism, and Christianity) is a key supplier of oil for the Europeans. Arab nationalism affected relations between Iran and the Arab world; unlike the Arab countries, it was not colonized by the Western powers, who viewed it as a buffer state with the Soviet Union after the breakup of the Ottoman Empire following World War I, and saw itself as equal to the Europeans. The Soviet invasion of Afghanistan created further tension with its support of fledgling Communist regimes while attacking an Islamic nation.

Shuttle diplomacy 
Shuttle diplomacy was instrumental in brokering a Middle Eastern peace. U.S. Secretary of State Henry Kissinger spent considerable time at Middle Eastern peace talks as a neutral party. He explained the reasons behind the need to pull out of Vietnam, which complicated the Middle Eastern talks and the nascent nuclear-nonproliferation-treaty talks. President Richard Nixon used the Sino-Soviet split to begin ending the Cold War by breaking down political and economic barriers between the U.S. and China, further isolating the Soviets. Kissinger spoke about his roles in brokering peace between the Arabs and Israelis and ending the nuclear-arms race. Nixon also became a key player in Middle East peace talks, ignoring Dwight D. Eisenhower's non-interventionism and hoping that his reputation for ending the Vietnam War, brokering the first nuclear-arms treaty and opening China to American trade would overshadow the Watergate scandal.

Camp David Accords and aftermath 
The Arab-Israeli peace process was complex during the Soviet era. Although the Soviets were reluctant to join the American-backed peace movement (since they wanted a divided West), the cost of the arms race was beginning to bankrupt the Soviet Union. Strained relations among the parties stalled the initial negotiations, exacerbated by American-North Vietnamese peace negotiations. Moscow was limited in the peace talks because it did not recognize Israel diplomatically, which enabled the United States to talk to both sides.

The U.S. responded to Soviet influence in the Middle East after the Camp David Accords by using economic sanctions to influence the Arab world. Geopolitics transitioned from post-Cold War polarization to 21st-century regional conflicts. The lack of two superpowers destabilized the Middle East as pressure-relieving, limited proxy conflicts grew into greater conflicts which spawned genocide.

See also
 Russia and the Middle East

References

Further reading
 Feifer, Gregory. The Great Gamble: The Soviet War in Afghanistan (Harper Collins, 2009)

 Heikal, Mohamed. The Sphinx and the Commissar: The Rise and Fall of Soviet Influence in the Middle East (Harper and Row, 1978).
 Kauppi, Mark V. and R. Craig Nation, eds. The Soviet Union and the Middle East in the 1980s (Lexington Books, 1983).
 Klieman, Aaron S. Soviet Russia and the Middle East (1970) online
 Lund, Aron. "From cold war to civil war: 75 years of Russian-Syrian relations." (Swedish Institute of International Affairs, 2019) online.
 Nizameddin, Talal. Russia and the Middle East: Towards a New Foreign Policy (St Martin's Press, 1999). online
 Primakov, Yevgeny. Russia and the Arabs: Behind the Scenes in the Middle East from the Cold War to the Present (Basic Books, 2009).
 Sayigh, Yezid, and Avi Shlaim, eds.  The Cold War and the Middle East (Clarendon Press, 1997).
 Smolansky, O. M.  "The United States and the Soviet Union in the Middle East". Proceedings of the Academy of Political Science  (1978). 33#1: 99–109. doi:10.2307/1173976. 
 Vasiliev, Alexey. Russia’s Middle East Policy: From Lenin to Putin (Routledge, 2018). excerpt

Cold War
Foreign relations of the Soviet Union
Politics of the Middle East